Centromere protein B also known as major centromere autoantigen B is an autoantigen protein of the cell nucleus. In humans, centromere protein B is encoded by the CENPB gene.

Function 

Centromere protein B is a highly conserved protein that facilitates centromere formation. It is a DNA-binding protein that is derived from transposases of the pogo DNA transposon family. It contains a helix-loop-helix DNA binding motif at the N-terminus and a dimerization domain at the C-terminus. The DNA binding domain recognizes and binds a 17-bp sequence (CENP-B box) in the centromeric alpha satellite DNA. This protein is proposed to play an important role in the assembly of specific centromere structures in interphase nuclei and on mitotic chromosomes. It is also considered a major centromere autoantigen recognized by sera from patients with anti-centromere antibodies.

Clinical significance 

Centromere protein B is a potential biomarker of small-cell lung cancer.

See also 
 Centromere

References

Further reading

External links